NGC 6207 is a spiral galaxy located in the constellation Hercules. It is designated as SA(s)c in the galaxy morphological classification scheme and was discovered by William Herschel on 16 May 1787. NGC 6207 is located at about 30 million light-years from Earth. It is located near the globular cluster Messier 13.

See also 
 List of NGC objects (6001–7000)

References

External links 
 

Unbarred spiral galaxies
Hercules (constellation)
6207
10521
58827